The white-throated bushtit (Aegithalos niveogularis), also known as the white-throated tit, is a species of bird in the family Aegithalidae.  It is found in India, Nepal, and Pakistan.  Its natural habitat is subtropical or tropical moist montane forests.

References

white-throated bushtit
Birds of North India
Birds of Nepal
white-throated bushtit
Taxonomy articles created by Polbot
white-throated bushtit